Johannes Christian Brünnich  (11 September 1861 – 3 July 1933) was an Australian agricultural chemist.

Brünnich was the son of Christian Christoph Brünnich, a Lutheran pastor and mathematician, and his wife Pauline Therese, née Kühnehe and was born at Gorizia, then in Austria-Hungary, now Italy. Raised in Bohemia, he was educated in Switzerland after his family moved there in 1874 and obtained his knowledge of chemistry at the federal polytechnic school at Zurich. He travelled in Russia and for a period was chemist in a sugar-mill in Bohemia. While performing Swiss military service in 1884, he met Dr J. J. Mueller of Gayndah, Queensland, and decided to emigrate to Australia, arriving in Brisbane early in 1885.

In 1887, Brünnich became chief chemist and mill manager for the Colonial Sugar Refining Company at Homebush, near Mackay. In 1897 he was appointed government agricultural chemist in the new Queensland Department of Agriculture. For about 35 years he advised the department on a multiplicity of problems relating to agriculture in Queensland, and drafted many bills for the government relating among other things to fertilizers, stock foods, pure seeds and the destruction of pests. He also made scientific investigations into the prickly pear problem, the use of dipping fluids, water pollution and the provision of phosphatic licks for stock. He was vice-president of the Royal Society of Queensland in 1907, president in 1908 and treasurer in 1909-14.

Brünnich did valuable pioneer work in his investigations of pasture composition and set a high standard in his department. Generally he was a strong influence in the development of applied chemistry during his time. He retired from the agriculture department in September 1931 and died of cerebro-vascular disease on 3 July 1933. In 1886, he married Kate Terry, who survived him with two sons and three daughters. He was a foundation member and fellow of the Royal Australian Chemical Institute and was elected a fellow of the Royal Institute of Chemistry of Great Britain in 1905. In 1908, he was president of the Royal Society of Queensland.

References

1861 births
1933 deaths
Australian chemists
People from Gorizia
Royal Society of Queensland
Fellows of the Royal Institute of Chemistry